The Door into Summer is a novel by Robert A. Heinlein.

Door into Summer may also refer to:

Natsu e no Tobira, a manga by Keiko Takemiya released in English as The Door into Summer
Door into Summer (album) an album by Jacob's Trouble
"A Door into Summer", a song by Joe Satriani from his album Unstoppable Momentum
"The Door into Summer", a song by the Monkees from their album Pisces, Aquarius, Capricorn & Jones Ltd.
"The Door into Summer", a song by Tatsuro Yamashita from his album Ride on Time
"Door into Summer", a song in the 1995 platformer Knuckles Chaotix''